The South Korean boy band Sechs Kies has released six studio albums, one extended play,  four compilation albums, one live album, one musical album, and several singles.

In August 2000, DSP was investigated by the police for allegations of tax evasion, embezzlement, and unequal contracts. DSP was cleared of suspicion. On the other hand, the National Tax Service conducted a tax audit of the corporation and collected additional hundreds of millions of won from it. So there are suspicions that the album sales were underreported in the purpose of tax evasion

The physical sales of SechsKies' albums remain unclear not only because of DSP's under-reporting but also because the official records do not exist for the first two albums. The Recording Industry Association of Korea (hereafter, RIAK)'s official website currently only shows album sales data from the year 1999. 한국영상음반협회 (The Korea Video Record Association), which preceded RIAK, had only announced physical album sales records from September 1998.

The physical album sales for the first album, School Byeolgok (학원별곡), was 600,000 according to newspaper articles. Kang Sunghoon has once mentioned that the first album sold 1,200,000 copies. The second album, Welcome To The Sechskies Land, sold 700,000 copies. In 2012, the former manager of SechsKies stated that their debut album sold between 1.7 and 1.8 million copies, but this may be a combined figure for the first two albums. The third album, Road Fighter, has two separate records. The official record reported by 한국영상음반협회 (The Korea Video Record Association) is 226,569. In contrast, a news report reveals that SechsKies' third album sold more than 700,000 copies. The official sales record for SechsKies' biggest hit, Special Album, is 305,307. As this was the most successful album of SechsKies, this official record seems to be a result of under-reporting. Eun Jiwon has stated the Special album sold approximately a million copies on a TV show. The discrepancy between official and news article is also great for the fourth album, Com’Back. The official record is merely 350,128. However, according to news articles, Com’Back seems to have sold for more than 700,000 copies.

However, the above statement is also not a fact. First of all, news articles were inaccurate at that time. There were many cases of exaggerating through the media. This problem received media spotlight by being reported on MBC in 1999. DSP media was the subject for that report. Thus high sales in the article are also inaccurate. And the National Tax Service just collected additional hundreds of millions of won, didn't say that it is from underreported album sales.

Albums

Studio albums

1 As there are no official sales records for earlier albums, estimated album sales are given

Compilation albums

Live albums

Musical albums

Extended plays

Singles

As a lead artist

Other charted songs

Music videos

Other appearances
1999 - 우린 하나되어 이겼어

References and NoteTag

Discographies of South Korean artists
K-pop music group discographies
Discography